Virtus Pallacanestro Bologna history and statistics in FIBA Europe and Euroleague Basketball (company) competitions.

European competitions

Worldwide competitions

Record
Virtus Pallacanestro Bologna has overall from 1960 to 1961 (first participation) to 2008-09 (last participation): 259 wins against 158 defeats in 417 games for all the European club competitions.
 (1st–tier) FIBA European Champions Cup or FIBA European League or FIBA Euroleague or Euroleague: 169–115 in 284 games.
 (2nd–tier) FIBA European Cup Winner's Cup or FIBA Saporta Cup: 48–25 in 73 games.
 (2nd–tier) ULEB Cup: 3–7 in 10 games.
 (3rd–tier) FIBA Korać Cup: 14–4 in 18 games.
 (3rd–tier) FIBA EuroCup or FIBA EuroChallenge: 25–7 in 32 games.

Also Virtus has a 4 (w) – 2 (d) record in the McDonald's Championship.

External links
FIBA Europe
Euroleague
ULEB
Eurocup

Basketball teams in Emilia-Romagna
Sport in Bologna